Hillar Zahkna (born 1 February 1968) is a retired Estonian biathlete. He competed at the 1992 Winter Olympics and the 1994 Winter Olympics. His son is biathlete Rene Zahkna.

References

External links
 

1968 births
Living people
Estonian male biathletes
Olympic biathletes of Estonia
Biathletes at the 1992 Winter Olympics
Biathletes at the 1994 Winter Olympics
People from Võru Parish